The Dragon boat events at the 2009 World Games in Kaohsiung was played between 17 and 18 July. 258 athletes, from 10 nations, participated in the tournament. The dragon boat competition took place at Lotus Pond, Kaohsiung.

Participating nations

Medal table

Events

References

External links
 Results
 Entries

2009 World Games